Gethin ( or ) is a Welsh name with two possible origins. It may mean "dark-skinned, swarthy". In other cases it may originate as a familiar form of the Old Welsh name Grippiud (strong lord, from "cryf", strong, and "udd", lord or ruler), modern Gruffydd and Griffith. It may refer to:

First name
Gethin Strutt (born 2000), English Strong Lord
Gethin Jenkins (born 1980), Welsh rugby union player
Gethin Jones (born 1978), Welsh television presenter
Gethin Robinson (born 1982), Welsh rugby union player

Surname
Ieuan Gethin (fl. c. 1350), Welsh language poet
Martin Gethin (born 1983), English boxer
Peter Gethin (1940–2011), English racing driver
Rhys Gethin (died 1405), Welsh supporter of rebel Owain Glyndwr
Rupert Gethin (born 1957), British Professor in Buddhist studies, President of the Pali Text Society
Stanley Gethin (1875–1950), English cricketer
William Gethin (1877–1939), English cricketer

See also 
 Gethins
 Gethin baronets, a title in the peerage of Ireland

References

Welsh masculine given names